Xiangdui Town, known in Tibetan as Qamdün, (',) is a town of about 8,000 people in the Zhag'yab County of the Chamdo Prefecture in the Tibet Autonomous Region of China. It is home to a Gelug monastery as well as to a specific "blue mask" variety of Tibetan Opera.

See also
List of towns and villages in Tibet

References

Populated places in Chamdo
Township-level divisions of Tibet